Stephan Trojansky is a German-American visual effects artist. He was nominated for an Academy Award in the category Best Visual Effects for the film Hereafter. Trojansky served as president of the Scanline VFX.

Selected filmography 
 Hereafter (2010; co-nominated with Michael Owens, Bryan Grill and Joe Farrell)

References

External links 

Living people
Place of birth missing (living people)
Year of birth missing (living people)
Visual effects artists
Visual effects supervisors
German emigrants to the United States